Madhavendra Puri ( in IAST) also known as Madhavendra Puri Goswami is a Vaishnava saint who appeared in the 14th century. He was initiated in to Dvaita Vedanta of Madhvacharya of Udupi region of Karnataka, was highly revered in   Chaitanya Mahaprabhu's Gaudiya Vaishnavism

Biography
Very little is known about the early years of Madhavendra Puri, as from the majority of sources he had already become a renunciant - a sannyasi. After making an extensive pilgrimage of India as a sannyasi he passed the remaining period of his life in Vrndavana and Orissa. The main source of knowledge about this personality is Caitanya Caritamrita. What is known is that he was a sannyasi of the Madhva line being a disciple of Lakshmipati Tirtha and it appears that Madhavendra was the founder of the Vaishnava centre at Mathura, Vrindavana.

He is also famed for receiving direct instructions and gifts from the deity of Gopinatha, who commanded him to travel for the supply of scarce sandal wood paste from Orissa to the Malaya Mountains.

Initiating sankirtana movement

Madhavendra Puri is often accepted as initial inspiration or initiator of the movement of Chaitanya Mahaprabhu, who accepted Madhavendras intimate disciple, Isvara Puri as his diksa guru. He is believed to have been preaching the principles of Gaudiya Vaishnavism prior to Caitanya.

Service in separation

It is believed that Caitanya Mahaprabhu’s service in feelings of separation viraha begins with a single verse spoken by Madhavendra Puri, (his grand preceptor):

"O, my beloved Lord, the friend of the afflicted! He Mathura-natha, when, when shall I see you? Without seeing you, my heart is perplexed, my beloved, and I am very restless! What am I to do?"

Lineage

In accordance with Gaudiya Vaishnava sources he is believed to belong to the Madhvacharya lineage that has been transcribed in books like Gaura-ganoddesa-dipika, Prameya-ratnavali and the writings of Gopala Guru Goswami. There is a version of this line of gurus recorded as a version found in the Gaura-ganoddesa-dipika which matches other historical records.  He had many disciples but Advaita Acarya and Isvara Puri are believed to be the chief disciples of Madhavendra Puri.

The early History of the famous deity of Khirachora Gopinatha (Ksirachora Gopinath) is not given in Gaudiya texts – it is given by Vinod Bijaya Babaji in Gopinatha Caritamrta. However, there is a large account of his interactions with this Deity in Caitanya caritamrita, the foundational book for the Gaudiya Vaishnavas.

Memorial

Madhavendra Puri died in Remuna. His memorial Samādhi and sandals are still worshiped there. It is a place of pilgrimage for many Vaishnava groups.

More information

Hardy, Friedhelm - Madhavendra Puri:  A Link Between Bengal Vaisnavism and South Indian Bhakti, JROS, no.1, 1974

References and notes

See also

Gaudiya religious leaders
Madhva religious leaders
Medieval Hindu religious leaders